The Dapper Dan Charities were founded by Pittsburgh Post-Gazette editor Al Abrams in 1936.  It is one of the oldest nonprofit and fundraising community sports clubs in the world and the oldest in Western Pennsylvania.  The foundation fundraises for its charities primarily through the annual "Dapper Dan Banquet".  Started in 1936, the first few banquets honored such regional figures as Art Rooney, Jock Sutherland and John Harris.  In 1939, the banquet began an annual tradition of naming the region's "Sportsman of the Year" and in 1999 the "Sportswoman of the Year". In recent decades, all charitable contributions raised by the banquet go to the Boys and Girls club of Western Pennsylvania, which directly funds activities and equipment for nearly 7,000 youths annually. The organization also presently sponsors the annual Dapper Dan Wrestling Classic.

Previous fundraisers included the occasional Dapper Dan Open golf tournament in the 1930s and 1940s, World Heavyweight Titles hosted at Forbes Field in the 1950s and 1960s and the Roundball Classic hosted at the Civic Arena from 1965 until the 1980s.

Through Pittsburgh Pirates broadcaster Bob Prince's friendship with Fred Hutchinson the Dapper Dan Charity awarded Major League Baseball's annual Hutch Award at the annual banquet until at least 1993.

Dapper Dan awards

Banquet festivities
Various years the Dapper Dan Banquet has been a who's who of Western Pennsylvania sports, and attracted national and even international stars and entertainers.  In 1993 George Wendt and David Lander hosted the event. Howard Baldwin, Craig Patrick, Lanny Frattare, Marty Schottenheimer, Rod Woodson, Ambassador Dan Rooney, Art Rooney, Mark May, John Brown, Sal Sunseri, Hank Aaron, Myron Cope, Lou Holtz, Terry Francona, Pat Mullins, Dave Robinson, Len Dawson, Lou Groza, Bud Wilkinson, Bob Prince, Governor Lawrence and Todd Blackledge have all participated in recent events.

References

External links
  Dapper Dan history page
 

Organizations based in Pittsburgh
Charities based in Pennsylvania
Organizations established in 1936
Sports in Pittsburgh